Matthew Newkirk (1794–1868), was a banker, railroad executive, and civic leader in Philadelphia, Pennsylvania. He was a director of the United States Bank, but he was best known as the president of the Philadelphia, Wilmington and Baltimore Railroad (PW&B), which in 1838 opened the first direct railroad link between Philadelphia and Baltimore, Maryland. He was also for many years the president of the Pennsylvania Temperance Society.

Newkirk was born May 31, 1794, the eighth of nine children, in Pittsgrove, New Jersey. At 16, he moved to Philadelphia to live with and work for Joseph and Collin Cooper, dry goods merchants on Front Street. He volunteered for military service in the War of 1812 and left the service as a corporal. He and a sister, Mary, opened a store near the Delaware River waterfront. "The business thrived, as did subsequent ones that extended his trade as far as New Orleans, and presently Newkirk had time and money to expend on other pursuits. His real estate investments spanned 11 states and a good share of Philadelphia's rental housing stock," wrote Hidden City Philadelphia.

In 1825, he formed a mercantile partnership with Charles S. Olden, who would later become governor of New Jersey.

In 1835, he bought 3,000 shares in the Wilmington and Susquehanna Railroad.

The same year, Newkirk bought a vacant lot at 13th and Arch Streets in downtown Philadelphia and built a mansion. Designed by Thomas Ustick Walter, it was built of marble and featured a fresco by Italian artist Nicola Monachesi.

Newkirk spent much of the 1830s leading efforts to raise money for and then build a rail line from Philadelphia south to the cities of Wilmington, Delaware, and Baltimore. Four railroads were chartered by the various states; Newkirk funded and directed the building of one of these, then orchestrated the merger of all four. In 1838, the merged PW&B began direct rail service between the cities, broken only by a ferry across the Susquehanna River. Much of its right-of-way is still in use today by Amtrak's Northeast Corridor.

Among the railroad's achievements was the first permanent bridge across the Schuylkill south of Market Street.  On August 14, 1838, the PW&B board of directors decided to name the bridge for Newkirk and to commission a monument at its west end. (Earlier in the year, the company gave Newkirk a silver service that included a large soup tureen, two tall pitchers, and an engraved tray; the tray alone was worth $1,000 ($ today). In 1896, the service was sold by a Philadelphia pawn shop to a New York City dealer.) 

In 1843, Newkirk was listed as the donor of the single largest monetary gift to the University of Delaware: $100. The university library still purchases books through the Matthew Newkirk Memorial Fund.

He later became a trustee of Princeton University.

Newkirk died in 1868 in his Philadelphia mansion and was interred at Laurel Hill Cemetery.

Eight years later, his family sold the building to the Society of the Sons of St. George, which renamed it "St. George's Hall" and used it as their headquarters. It was torn down in 1903. The front colonnade survives at the Princeton Battlefield State Park in New Jersey.

References

External links
Drawings and images of Newkirk's mansion
 Insurance policies written 1824-82 for Matthew Newkirk by the Philadelphia Contributionship

19th-century American railroad executives
1794 births
1868 deaths
American temperance activists
Burials at Laurel Hill Cemetery (Philadelphia)
People from Pittsgrove Township, New Jersey
People from New Jersey in the War of 1812
Princeton University people